The PMPC Star Award for Best Magazine Show is given to the best television magazine program of the year and also magazine show hosts.

Winners

Best Magazine Show

 1987: Isip Pinoy (RPN 9)
 1988:
 1989: Travel Time (IBC 13)
 1990:
 1991: The Inside Story (ABS-CBN 2) & The Probe Team (GMA 7) [tied]
 1992: The Probe Team (GMA 7)
 1993: The Inside Story (ABS-CBN 2)
 1994: The Probe Team (GMA 7)
 1995:
 1996:
 1997:
 1998: The Probe Team (GMA 7)
 1999:
 2000: The Probe Team (GMA 7)
 2001: The Probe Team (GMA 7)
 2002: Jessica Soho Reports (GMA 7)
 2003: The Correspondents (ABS-CBN 2)
 2004: Kontrobersyal (ABS-CBN 2)
 2005: Rated K (ABS-CBN 2)
 2006: Rated K (ABS-CBN 2)
 2007: Rated K (ABS-CBN 2)
 2008: Rated K (ABS-CBN 2)
 2009: Kapuso Mo, Jessica Soho (GMA 7)
 2010: Kapuso Mo, Jessica Soho (GMA 7)
 2011: Rated K (ABS-CBN 2)
 2012: Kapuso Mo, Jessica Soho (GMA 7)
 2013: I Juander (GMA News TV)
 2014: I Juander (GMA News TV)
 2015: Rated K (ABS-CBN 2)
 2016: Rated K (ABS-CBN 2)
 2017: Kapuso Mo, Jessica Soho (GMA 7)
 2018: Kapuso Mo, Jessica Soho (GMA 7)
 2019: Rated K (ABS-CBN 2)
 2021: Kapuso Mo, Jessica Soho (GMA 7)

Best Magazine Show Hosts

 1987: Loren Legarda (PEP Talk / ABS-CBN 2)
 1988:
 1989: Susan Calo-Medina (Travel Time / IBC 13)
 1990:
 1991: Cheche Lazaro (The Probe Team / GMA 7)
 1992: Loren Legarda (The Inside Story / ABS-CBN 2)
 1993: Loren Legarda (The Inside Story / ABS-CBN 2)
 1994:
 1995:
 1996:
 1997:
 1998: Cheche Lazaro (The Probe Team / GMA 7)
 1999:
 2000: Cheche Lazaro (The Probe Team / GMA 7)
 2001: Cheche Lazaro (The Probe Team / GMA 7)
 2002: Jessica Soho (Jessica Soho Reports / GMA 7)
 2003: Karen Davila (The Correspondents / ABS-CBN 2)
 2004: Boy Abunda (Kontrobersyal / ABS-CBN 2)
 2005: Korina Sanchez (Rated K / ABS-CBN 2)
 2006: Korina Sanchez (Rated K / ABS-CBN 2)
 2007: Korina Sanchez (Rated K / ABS-CBN 2)
 2008: Korina Sanchez (Rated K / ABS-CBN 2)
 2009: Jessica Soho (Kapuso Mo, Jessica Soho / GMA 7)
 2010: Jessica Soho (Kapuso Mo, Jessica Soho / GMA 7)
 2011: Korina Sanchez (Rated K / ABS-CBN 2)
 2012: Jessica Soho (Kapuso Mo, Jessica Soho / GMA 7)
 2013: Jessica Soho (Kapuso Mo, Jessica Soho / GMA 7)
 2014: Cesar Apolinario and Susan Enriquez (I Juander / GMA News TV)
 2015: Korina Sanchez (Rated K / ABS-CBN 2)
 2016: Korina Sanchez (Rated K / ABS-CBN 2)
 2017: Korina Sanchez (Rated K / ABS-CBN 2)
 2018: Korina Sanchez (Rated K / ABS-CBN 2)
 2019: Korina Sanchez (Rated K / ABS-CBN 2)
 2021: Jessica Soho (Kapuso Mo, Jessica Soho / GMA 7)

References

PMPC Star Awards for Television